Die Mutter is an East German film. It was released in 1958. It is an adaptation of the 1932 play by Bertolt Brecht, which in itself is based on  the 1906 novel by Maxim Gorky.

External links
 

1958 films
East German films
Films based on works by Bertolt Brecht
Films based on works by Maxim Gorky
1950s German-language films
Filmed stage productions
1950s German films